Claus Vissing (born 6 June 1986) is a Danish speedway rider.

Career
Vissing made his British league debut for Stoke Potters in the 2007 Premier League speedway season before joining Peterborough Panthers for the 2008 and 2009 seasons. In 2010, he rode in the top tier of British Speedway, riding for Ipswich Witches during the 2010 Elite League speedway season. The following season in 2011, he signed for Birmingham Brummies but soon moved on to Somerset Rebels for 2012. He then spent three years in Scotland with Edinburgh Monarchs and Berwick Bandits respectively.

In 2016, he joined Workington Comets and then rode again for Berwick in 2017. He was a member of the Swindon Robins team in the SGB Premiership 2019 that won the league and Knockout cup double. He also had two solid seasons in the Championship, helping Glasgow Tigers to two second place finishes in 2018 and 2019.

After a COVID-19 pandemic cancelled 2020 season he was released by Newcastle Diamonds for the SGB Championship 2021 because of travel restrictions.

In 2022, he re-joined and rode for the Birmingham Brummies in the SGB Championship 2022. In 2023, he returned to Glasgow for the SGB Championship 2023.

References 

1986 births
Living people
Danish speedway riders
Berwick Bandits riders
Birmingham Brummies riders
Edinburgh Monarchs riders
Glasgow Tigers riders
Ipswich Witches riders
Peterborough Panthers riders
Somerset Rebels riders
Stoke Potters riders
Swindon Robins riders
Workington Comets riders